Gary S. Lawson is an American lawyer whose focus is in administrative law, constitutional law, and jurisprudence. He is currently the Philip S. Beck Professor of Law at Boston University School of Law. He previously taught at the Northwestern University Pritzker School of Law. He is the secretary of the board of directors of the Federalist Society. With Steven G. Calabresi, he has argued that the Mueller Probe was "unlawful."

Selected works

References

Year of birth missing (living people)
Living people
Claremont McKenna College alumni
Yale Law School alumni
Northwestern University Pritzker School of Law faculty
Boston University School of Law faculty
Federalist Society members
20th-century American lawyers
21st-century American lawyers